The Roman Catholic Diocese of Arundel and Brighton (in ) is a Latin Church Roman Catholic diocese in southern England covering the counties of Sussex and Surrey (excluding Spelthorne, which is part of the Diocese of Westminster). The diocese was erected on 28 May 1965 by Pope Paul VI, having previously been a part of the larger Diocese of Southwark, which was elevated to an archdiocese with a new ecclesiastical province on the same date.

Bishops
There have been five bishops of this diocese. The first was Bishop David Cashman, who was consecrated on 14 June 1965. He died in March 1971 and was succeeded by Bishop Michael George Bowen, who was translated in April 1977 to head the Archdiocese of Southwark. He was succeeded by then-Bishop Cormac Murphy-O'Connor who, in March 2000, became the 10th Archbishop of Westminster, and later, a Cardinal.

His successor, Bishop Kieran Conry, served from 2001 until his resignation in 2014. On Saturday, 21 March 2015, Pope Francis appointed Bishop Richard Moth, who had been serving as the Catholic Military Ordinary for Great Britain, to be the fifth Bishop of Arundel and Brighton. He was installed on Thursday, 28 May 2015, at Arundel Cathedral, the fiftieth anniversary of the Diocese's creation.

David John Cashman (1965-1971)
Michael George Bowen (1971-1977), appointed Archbishop of Southwark
Cormac Murphy-O'Connor (1977-2000), appointed Archbishop of Westminster (Cardinal in 2001)
Kieran Thomas Conry (2001-2014)
Charles Phillip Richard Moth (2015- )

Coadjutor Bishop
Michael George Bowen (1970-1971)

Other priests of this diocese who became bishops
Maurice Noël Léon Couve de Murville, appointed Archbishop of Birmingham in 1982
Bernard Longley, appointed auxiliary bishop of Westminster in 2003

Metropolitan Province
The diocese comprises part of the Metropolitan Province of Southwark, which is currently presided over by the Most Reverend John Wilson, by virtue of his office of Archbishop of Southwark. The diocese itself covers the administrative counties of West and East Sussex, Surrey outside of the Greater London Boroughs, and the unitary authority of Brighton & Hove. It is one of 22 Roman Catholic dioceses in England and Wales.

Geographical area
Situated in the South East of England, the Diocese encompasses many villages and smaller towns, as well as highly populated parts of Surrey, central Sussex and the coastal region running from Chichester to the Kent border.

Mass attendance
The Diocese has a weekly Mass attendance of 43,377 persons, which would be approximately one quarter of the total Catholic population. There are 116 parishes with a number of other centres where Mass is celebrated regularly. In April 2005, the Diocese had 182 diocesan and 97 religious priests, as well as 16 permanent deacons.  There are many religious institutes, of both men and women, living and working in the Diocese in a number of apostolates. The Diocese has a total of 90 Catholic schools.

Local pilgrimage
The Diocese also founded the Arundel and Brighton Pilgrimage, which now occurs annually during the two weeks running up to the August bank holiday. Though the pilgrimage is largely Roman Catholic, it is in fact ecumenical and there are several Anglican attendants. The first walk took place in 1975 around the Diocese but has since gone on to include cross-country routes through England and Wales, with different themes and stops at various churches and cathedrals.

Anti-abuse policy
In the early 2000s, the sexual abuse scandal in Arundel and Brighton diocese hurt the public's trust in the work of local diocesan officials.

See also
 Catholic Church in England and Wales
 List of Catholic churches in the United Kingdom
List of Catholic dioceses in Great Britain

References

External links
Diocese Official Website
GCatholic.org
The Catholic Children's Society

 
Religious organisations based in England
Christian organizations established in 1965
Religion in Surrey
Religion in East Sussex
Religion in West Sussex
Roman Catholic dioceses and prelatures established in the 20th century
Roman Catholic Ecclesiastical Province of Southwark